Corydoras semiaquilus is a tropical freshwater fish belonging to the Corydoradinae subfamily of the family Callichthyidae.  It originates in inland waters in South America, and is found in the western Amazon River basin in Brazil and Peru.

The fish will grow in length up to 2.4 in (6.0 cm).  It lives in a tropical climate in water with a 6.0–8.0 pH, a water hardness of 2.0–25 dGH, and a temperature range of 72–79 °F (22–26 °C).  It feeds on worms, benthic crustaceans, insects, and plant matter.  It lays eggs in dense vegetation; adults do not guard the eggs.

See also
List of freshwater aquarium fish species

References

External links
Photos at Fishbase

Corydoras
Taxa named by Stanley Howard Weitzman
Fish described in 1964